Normal is a 2003 American made-for-television drama film produced by HBO Films, which became an official selection at the 2003 Sundance Film Festival. Jane Anderson, the film's writer and director, adapted her own play, Looking for Normal. The film is about a fictional Midwestern factory worker named Roy Applewood, who stuns his wife of 25 years by saying he wishes to undergo sex reassignment surgery and transition to a woman.

In an HBO interview, Anderson was asked "Were you drawing on any sources when you were researching this? Or was it purely out of your imagination?", to which she replied "Oh, it's my imagination, it's all fiction." She also said that she wanted to use the play "as a metaphor for a study of marriage", calling transition the "ultimate betrayal".

Plot
Roy Applewood (Tom Wilkinson), after fainting on the night of 25th marriage anniversary, shocks his wife Irma (Jessica Lange) by revealing plans to transition into a woman named Ruth. While Ruth tries to keep the family together, Irma's initial reaction is to separate from her. Patty Ann (Hayden Panettiere), their daughter, is more accepting, but Wayne (Joseph Sikora), their son, struggles with the transition. He mocks Ruth after receiving an explanation letter.

The movie follows the fictitious story of the character Ruth in the depiction of her transition. She buys women's clothes, wears earrings and puts on perfume.  She finds graffiti on her truck "You are not normal".  Her mother decides not to tell her father. She is kicked out of church choir. Irma finds Ruth in the barn with a gun to her head. She invites her back home. Her teen daughter just got her period and doesn't like being a girl. Son Wayne comes home for Thanksgiving and ends up in a fist fight with Ruth. The son yells obscenities at her and then cries in her arms. After a year passes she goes in for surgery with full support of Irma.

Ruth faces ostracism at church and at work. She finds understanding from her boss, Frank, but not from her minister. In the end, Irma discovers that love transcends gender and the family survives.

Cast
 Jessica Lange as Irma Applewood
 Tom Wilkinson as Roy/Ruth Applewood
 Clancy Brown as Frank
 Hayden Panettiere as Patty Ann Applewood
 Joseph Sikora as Wayne Applewood
 Richard Bull as Roy Applewood, Sr.
 Mary Seibel as Em Applewood
 Randall Arney as Reverend Dale Muncie
 Rondi Reed as Roy's Sister Beth

Reception
Robert Pardi of TV Guide, reviewed the film and stated "Writer-director Jane Anderson tries to shoehorn her own play into the TV-tragedy", "but it's an awkward fit" and "Although the performances are superb, the film's detachment doesn't suit the bizarre material".

On Rotten Tomatoes the film has an approval rating of 100% based on 7 reviews, and an average rating of 7.2/10.

Andrea from transgendermap.com noted "outstanding job of illustrating the main difficulties faced by blue-collar transsexual women in small towns" and the film contained "surprising amount of appropriate humor".

Awards and nominations
Normal was nominated for three Golden Globe Awards, won one Primetime Emmy Award and was nominated for another five.

Jessica Lange and Tom Wilkinson both received acting nominations for the Golden Globe, Primetime Emmy, and Satellite Awards.

See also

 Transamerica (2005)
 Transparent (2014)
 Becoming Us (2015)
 Transgender in film and television

References

External links
 
 

2003 films
2003 LGBT-related films
2003 drama films
American LGBT-related television films
American films based on plays
Films directed by Jane Anderson
Films scored by Alex Wurman
HBO Films films
Films about trans women
Films shot in Illinois
Films with screenplays by Jane Anderson
American drama television films
2000s English-language films
2000s American films